Overbeek may refer to:

Daniel Overbeek (1695–1751), Dutch colonial ruler of Ceylon
Daniel Anthony Overbeek (1765–1840), Dutch resident of Bengal
Theodoor Overbeek (1911-2007), Dutch chemist
Michiel Daniel Overbeek (1920–2001), South African amateur astronomer
5038 Overbeek, an asteroid